Blind Spot is the fourth and final extended play (EP) by English rock band Lush. Released on 15 April 2016, by the band's record label Edamame, the EP contains the band's first new material since 1996, following their reunion in 2015. It was produced by Jim Abbiss and Ladytron member Daniel Hunt.

Recording
The EP was recorded before the band started rehearsals for their 2015-16 reunion. The first stage involved recording home demos, which were sent to co-producer Hunt, who was in Brazil at the time. The second stage was recorded in co-producer Abbiss's Lime Green Monkey studio.

Video
The music video for the EP's opening track, "Out of Control", was released on 19 February 2016. It was directed by Martin Masai Andersen and Kim Thue.

Critical reception 

Blind Spot received generally positive reviews from music critics upon its release. At Metacritic, which assigns a normalized score out of 100 to ratings from publications, the album received a mean score of 76 based on 8 reviews, indicating "generally favourable reviews".

Track listing

Personnel
Lush
 Miki Berenyi – lead vocals, guitar
 Emma Anderson – guitar, backing vocals
 Phil King – bass
 Justin Welch – drums

Additional personnel
 Jim Abbiss – production 
 Daniel Hunt – production, backing vocals
 Audrey Riley – string arrangement
 Edd Hartwell – studio engineer

Charts

References

External links
 

Lush (band) EPs
2016 EPs
Self-released EPs
Albums produced by Jim Abbiss